The stomatogastric ganglion (STG) is a much studied ganglion (collection of neurons) found in arthropods and studied extensively in decapod crustaceans. It is part of the stomatogastric nervous system.

See also 

 Central pattern generator

References 

Crustacean anatomy